KPKL (107.1 FM) is a radio station licensed to Deer Park, Washington, and serving the Spokane metropolitan area.  The station airs an oldies radio format.  The broadcast license is held by Robert Anthony and Patricia Fogal, through licensee Spokane Broadcasting Company, LLC. Rob Harder is the CEO.

KPKL's studios and offices are on East Greenbush Avenue in Colbert, Washington. The transmitter is in Loon Lake, Washington, of U.S. Route 395.  KPKL also operates a booster station in Spokane, 5,000 watt KPKL-FM-1, transmitting from the top of an apartment building on South Westcliff Place.  Due to financial problems, the station was off the air under previous owners for twelve months in 2008-2009 and nine months in 2012.

History
In September 1983, the station first signed on as KNOI.  It was owned by Tri-County Broadcasting and aired an adult contemporary music format.  The power at first was only 3,000 watts, so it did not reach most of the Spokane radio market from its Deer Park location.

On April 1, 1986, the station was assigned the KAZZ call sign by the Federal Communications Commission (FCC).  The station featured veteran 1970s WHYI Miami DJs Mark In The Dark and Big Al, and also included local radio veterans JP Bzet and Dean Jaxson.  The station for a time aired a children's radio format, as a Radio AAHS Network affiliate, the only FM station on the network.

According to the FCC records, the station went dark on June 4, 2008.  On June 16, 2008, it applied for special temporary authority (STA) to "remain silent" which was granted on July 9, 2008. The reason given in the application was "a secured creditor has seized transmitting equipment necessary to the operation of the station."  Per the FCC notification, KAZZ's license would automatically expire as a matter of law if broadcast operations did not resume by 12:01 a.m. on June 5, 2009.  KAZZ stayed off the air for almost a year.

In May 2009, an application was filed with the FCC for the involuntary assignment of the KAZZ broadcast license from Proactive Communications, Inc., to Nancy L. Isserlis, acting as receiver for KAZZ.  The transfer was approved by the FCC on May 15, 2009, and the transaction was consummated on the same day.  The station resumed broadcasting in June 2009, with a classic hits music format branded as "K-HITS."

KAZZ fell silent again on March 2, 2012, due to financial problems.  This time, the station was off the air for nine months.  On September 26, 2012, KAZZ's license was transferred to Robert Anthony and Patricia Fogal's Spokane Broadcasting Company, LLC, for consideration of $450,000. The station's call sign was changed the same day to KPKL. KPKL went back on the air on November 12, at first stunting with Christmas music.

References

External links
Station website

PKL
Radio stations established in 1983